Jiamusi University is a multi-disciplinary university situated in the city of Jiamusi, Heilongjiang Province, People's Republic of China.

Jiamusi University was established in 1947.

One of the players in the Chinese team at the 2015 Bandy World Championship was from Jiamusi University.

References

Universities and colleges in Heilongjiang
Educational institutions established in 1947
Universities in China with English-medium medical schools
1947 establishments in China